Minnesota State Highway 220 (MN 220) is a  regional trunk highway in northwest Minnesota, which runs from its intersection with U.S. Highway 75 in Climax and continues north to its northern terminus at its intersection with MN 11 near Drayton, North Dakota.  The route runs along and near the Red River.

For part of its route (4 miles), MN 220 runs together with U.S. Highway 2 in the city of East Grand Forks.

Route description
Highway 220 serves as a north–south route in northwest Minnesota between Climax, East Grand Forks, Alvarado, Oslo, and Robbin.

Red River State Recreation Area is located in the city of East Grand Forks near the junction of Highway 220 and U.S. Highway 2.

Highway 220 parallels Interstate 29 throughout its route.

The route is legally defined as Route 220 in the Minnesota Statutes.

History
Highway 220 was authorized on July 1, 1949. It originally intersected U.S. 75 near Eldred and followed present-day County State-Aid Highway 45 to its current routing. It was rerouted south to intersect U.S. 75 at Climax in the late 1950s.

The route was completely paved by 1970.

Major intersections

References

220
Transportation in Polk County, Minnesota
Transportation in Marshall County, Minnesota
Transportation in Kittson County, Minnesota